Saint Brian Model College is a Catholic secondary school in Akwa Ibom State, Nigeria.

References 

Schools in Akwa Ibom State
Catholic schools in Nigeria